Amorphous uranium(VI) oxide (am-U2O7) is an orange diuranyl compound, most commonly obtained from the thermal decomposition of uranyl peroxide tetrahydrate at temperatures between 150 and 500 °C. It exists at room temperature as a powder. Am-U2O7 does not comprise a regular, long-range atomic structure, as demonstrated by its characteristic diffuse scattering pattern obtained by X-ray diffraction. As a result, the molecular structure of this material is little understood, although experimental and computational attempts to elucidate a local atomic environment have yielded some success.

Production 
Am-U2O7 is produced by the thermal decomposition of uranyl peroxide tetrahydrate at temperatures between 150 and 500 °C, in either an air or nitrogen atmosphere. The resultant powder is tan orange in colour. Further heating results in the formation of alpha uranium trioxide (α-UO3).

Structure and Reactivity 
Due to the amorphous nature of am-U2O7, the long-range atomic structure of this compound has not been determined. However, recent computational investigations, chiefly accomplished using density functional theory (DFT), have helped to predict a local structure. Resembling a regular uranate compound, two uranyl ([UO2]2+) groups are bridged by a μ2-O atom, where both uranium atoms are bonded to a O-O peroxo unit. In this case, a tetrameric ring would be the most stable conformation of the compound. The presence of a peroxide bond in species obtained in this temperature range is unusual; uranyl peroxide has previously been considered to be the only peroxide bearing uranium compound. Developments on this structure propose a two-site metastudtite and UO3-like bonding environment, including the bond types already mentioned. Few other suggestions for the local atomic structure of am-U2O7 have been made, although a crystalline form of U2O7, calculated as a two-site 6 and 8-coordinate structure, has been reported. In the same study, it was again found that the U2O7 species contained peroxide bonding. Am-U2O7 is known to undergo hydrolysis in the presence of water, to produce a crystalline metaschoepite powder. In addition to a change in crystallinity, this reaction involves a change in colour from orange to bright yellow.

References 

Uranium(VI) compounds